Trångsund is a part of Huddinge to the south of Stockholm located between the two lakes Magelungen and Drevviken. Trångsund had 9,114 inhabitants in 2019. Trångsund is 17 minutes away from Stockholm City Station by train on the Bålsta-Nynäshamn line of the Stockholm commuter rail.

Sports
The following sports clubs are located in Trångsund:

 Skogås-Trångsunds FF

References

Stockholm urban area
Metropolitan Stockholm